The 1966 Masters Tournament was the 30th Masters Tournament, held April 7–11 at Augusta National Golf Club in Augusta, Georgia.

Jack Nicklaus, age 26, earned his third Green Jacket in an 18-hole Monday playoff and became the first back-to-back champion at the Masters. He ended regulation at even-par 288, tied with Tommy Jacobs and Gay Brewer. Nicklaus shot a 70 in the extra round on Monday to defeat Jacobs (72) and Brewer (78). Nicklaus' score the previous year in 1965 was significantly lower at 271 (−17), a record which stood for 32 years.

On Sunday, Brewer shot a 33 (−3) on the front nine and then had eight pars as he came to the 72nd hole with a one-shot lead. This was the last Masters that two-time champion Byron Nelson played in; he shot 76 and 78 and missed the cut by one stroke. The 36-hole cut at 153 (+9) was the highest to date, exceeded only in 1982.

A close friend of Nicklaus was among four that died in a private plane crash in Tennessee on Wednesday, while en route to Augusta from Columbus, Ohio. Nicklaus learned of the incident late that night and responded with a 68 in the first round, but fell back with a 76 on Friday.

It was the fifth of 18 major titles for Nicklaus, and his only successful defense of a major. Three months later, he completed the first of his three career grand slams at Muirfield in the Open Championship. Later back-to-back winners at Augusta were Nick Faldo (1989 and 1990, both playoffs) and Tiger Woods (2001 and 2002).

Terry Dill won the seventh Par 3 contest on Wednesday with a score of 22.

Brewer rebounded and won the tournament the next year, while Nicklaus' attempt at three consecutive titles ended early with a rare missed cut. Jacobs never won a major; he was also a runner-up in the U.S. Open in 1964 at Congressional.

CBS commentator Jack Whitaker referred to the gallery at the end of the 18-hole Monday playoff as a "mob" and was banned from the next five Masters (1967–1971).

Course

^ Holes 1, 2, 4, and 11 were later renamed.

Field
1. Masters champions
Jack Burke Jr. (4,10), Doug Ford, Claude Harmon, Ben Hogan (8), Herman Keiser, Cary Middlecoff (2), Byron Nelson (8), Jack Nicklaus (2,4,8,10), Arnold Palmer (2,3,8,11), Henry Picard, Gary Player (2,3,4,8,9), Gene Sarazen, Sam Snead (10), Art Wall Jr.
Jimmy Demaret, Ralph Guldahl, and Craig Wood did not play.

The following categories only apply to Americans

2. U.S. Open champions (last 10 years)
Tommy Bolt (8), Julius Boros (9,11), Billy Casper (10,11), Gene Littler (8,9,11), Dick Mayer, Ken Venturi (11)

3. The Open champions (last 10 years)
Tony Lema (8,9,11)

4. PGA champions (last 10 years)
Jerry Barber, Dow Finsterwald (8), Jay Hebert, Lionel Hebert, Dave Marr (10,11), Bobby Nichols, Bob Rosburg

5. U.S. Amateur and Amateur champions (last 10 years)
Deane Beman (6,9,a), William C. Campbell (6,7,a), Charles Coe (a), Richard Davies (a), Bob Murphy (7,a), Harvie Ward (a)

Other champions forfeited their exemptions by turning professional.

6. Members of the 1965 U.S. Walker Cup team
Don Allen (7,a), Dave Eichelberger (a), Downing Gray (a), John Mark Hopkins (a), Dale Morey (a), Billy Joe Patton (a), Ed Tutwiler (a), Ed Updegraff (a)

7. The first eight finishers and ties in the 1965 U.S. Amateur
Tommy Barnes Jr. (a), Ron Cerrudo (a), Bob Dickson (a), Jimmy Grant (a), Bert Greene (a), Rod Horn (a), Cesar Sanudo (a), James Vickers (a)

8. Top 24 players and ties from the 1965 Masters Tournament
Tommy Aaron (10), George Bayer, Frank Beard (9), Terry Dill, Wes Ellis, Al Geiberger (9), Paul Harney, Tommy Jacobs (11), Mason Rudolph (9), Doug Sanders (9), Dan Sikes

9. Top 16 players and ties from the 1965 U.S. Open
Gay Brewer, Raymond Floyd, Billy Maxwell, Steve Oppermann, Dudley Wysong

10. Top eight players and ties from 1965 PGA Championship
Jacky Cupit, Gardner Dickinson, Rod Funseth, Bob McCallister, Bo Wininger

11. Members of the U.S. 1965 Ryder Cup team
Don January, Johnny Pott

12. Two players selected for meritorious records on the fall part of the 1965 PGA Tour
Charles Coody, Randy Glover

13. One player, either amateur or professional, not already qualified, selected by a ballot of ex-Masters champions
Mike Souchak

14. One professional, not already qualified, selected by a ballot of ex-U.S. Open champions
Bob Goalby

15. One amateur, not already qualified, selected by a ballot of ex-U.S. Amateur champions
Bunky Henry (a)

16. Two players, not already qualified, from a points list based on finishes in the winter part of the 1966 PGA Tour
Phil Rodgers, R. H. Sikes

17. Foreign invitations
Peter Alliss, Michael Bonallack (5,a), Peter Butler, Bob Charles (3), Chen Ching-Po, Neil Coles, Bruce Crampton (8), Roberto De Vicenzo, Bruce Devlin (8,9,10), Rodney Foster (a), Jean Garaïalde, Harold Henning, Jimmy Hitchcock, Bernard Hunt, Tomoo Ishii, George Knudson (8), Cobie Legrange, Kel Nagle (3,8,9), Lionel Platts, Luis Silverio (a), Ramón Sota (8), Dave Thomas, George Will

Numbers in brackets indicate categories that the player would have qualified under had they been American.

Round summaries

First round
Thursday, April 7, 1966

Source

Second round
Friday, April 8, 1966

Source

Third round
Saturday, April 9, 1966

Source

Final round
Sunday, April 10, 1966

Final leaderboard

Sources:

Scorecard

Cumulative tournament scores, relative to par

Playoff 
Monday, April 11, 1966

Scorecard

Cumulative tournament scores, relative to par

Source:

References

External links
Masters.com – Past winners
Augusta.com – 1966 Masters leaderboard and scorecards

1966
1966 in golf
1966 in American sports
1966 in sports in Georgia (U.S. state)
April 1966 sports events in the United States